Pholidobolus montium, the mountain pholiodobolus, is a species of lizard in the family Gymnophthalmidae. It is found in Ecuador and Colombia.

References

Pholidobolus
Reptiles described in 1863
Taxa named by Wilhelm Peters